Gary Sherrer (born September 3, 1940) is an American former politician. He was the 45th Lieutenant Governor of Kansas from 1996 to 2003. He is an alumnus of Emporia State University.

References

 

1940 births
Living people
Kansas Republicans
Emporia State University alumni
Lieutenant Governors of Kansas
Place of birth missing (living people)